There are at least 121 named trails in Lewis and Clark County, Montana according to the U.S. Geological Survey, Board of Geographic Names.  A trail is defined as: "Route for passage from one point to another; does not include roads or highways (jeep trail, path, ski trail)."

 1906 Trail, el.  
 Ahorn Creek Trail, el.  
 Arrastra Creek Trail, el.  
 Aztec Ski Trail, el.  
 Backside Trail, el.  
 Backyard Ski Trail, el.  
 Bear Gulch Trail, el.  
 Belmont Bowl Ski Trail, el.  
 Between the Peaks Ski Trail, el.  
 Blacktail Creek Trail, el.  
 Bonanza Ski Trail, el.  
 Broadway Ski Trail, el.  
 Broncho Ski Trail, el.  
 Bull Chute Ski Trail, el.  
 Cabin Creek Dobrota Trail, el.  
 Caribou Trail, el.  
 Catamount Ski Trail, el.  
 Chinese Wall Trail, el.  
 Cigarette Creek Trail, el.  
 Cold Turkey Cut-Off Ski Trail, el.  
 Cooney Creek Trail, el.  
 Corkscrew Ski Trail, el.  
 Cougar Ski Trail, el.  
 Crosscut Ski Trail, el.  
 Crown Mountain Trail, el.  
 Cruse Ski Trail, el.  
 Cub Ski Trail, el.  
 Dago Face Ski Trail, el.  
 Dark Forest Ski Trail, el.  
 Deadman Ski Trail, el.  
 Dry Fork Cabin Creek Trail, el.  
 Dry Gulch Ski Trail, el.  
 Earthquake Ski Trail, el.  
 Eclipse Ski Trail, el.  
 Elbow Pass Trail, el.  
 Eldorado Ski Trail, el.  
 Elk Pass Trail, el.  
 Fairview Trail, el.  
 Flesher Pass Trail, el.  
 Ford Willow Creek Trail, el.  
 Fountain Head Ski Trail, el.  
 Fourth of July Ski Trail, el.  
 Good Luck Ski Trail, el.  
 Gould Helmville Trail, el.  
 Halfmoon Dearborn River Trail, el.  
 Hals Ski Trail, el.  
 Hanging Valley National Recreation Trail, el.  
 Hardluck Ski Trail, el.  
 Headwall Ski Trail, el.  
 Hiballer Ski Trail, el.  
 Hibernation Ski Trail, el.  
 Hi-Voltage Ski Trail, el.  
 Hogback Trail, el.  
 Huckleberry Hill Ski Trail, el.  
 Huggins Flat Ski Trail, el.  
 Jackpot Ski Trail, el.  
 Jakie Creek Trail, el.  
 Kinnickinnick Ski Trail, el.  
 Landers Fork Trail, el.  
 Last Hope Ski Trail, el.  
 Littles Ski Trail, el.  
 Liverpool Snowbank Trail, el.  
 Lone Mountain Trail, el.  
 Lost Cabin Cave Creek Trail, el.  
 Lower Broncho Ski Trail, el.  
 Lower Wild Acres Ski Trail, el.  
 Main Line Trail, el.  
 Meadow Creek Trail, el.  
 Middle Zee Ski Trail, el.  
 Miners Basin Ski Trail, el.  
 Mount Helena National Recreation Trail, el.  
 North Access Trail, el.  
 North Fork Trail, el.  
 North Forty Ski Trail, el.  
 North Woods Ski Trail, el.  
 Patrol Mountain Lookout Trail, el.  
 Petty Crown Creek Trail, el.  
 Petty Ford Creek Trail, el.  
 Piskun Ridge Ski Trail, el.  
 Pit Parks Ski Trail, el.  
 Pluto Ski Trail, el.  
 Powderbound Ski Trail, el.  
 Power Drive Ski Trail, el.  
 Prairie Trail, el.  
 Prospect Shafts Trail, el.  
 Puma Ski Trail, el.  
 Rabbit Ski Trail, el.  
 Rawhide Ridge Ski Trail, el.  
 Rawhide Road Ski Trail, el.  
 Red Mountain Trail, el.  
 Red Tail Trail Ski Trail, el.  
 Ridge Run Ski Trail, el.  
 Rock Creek Trail, el.  
 Rogue Ski Trail, el.  
 Scout Ski Trail, el.  
 Shady Lane Ski Trail, el.  
 Shanty Ski Trail, el.  
 Silver King Trail, el.  
 Skyline Ski Trail, el.  
 Smith Creek Trail, el.  
 Snagletooth Ski Trail, el.  
 Snow Fields Ski Trail, el.  
 Snowshoe Ski Trail, el.  
 Spread Mountain Trail, el.  
 Steamboat Lookout Pass, el.  
 Sunshine Bowl Ski Trail, el.  
 Sweeney Creek Ecology Trail, el.  
 The Big Open Ski Trail, el.  
 The Drifts Ski Trail, el.  
 The Hollow Ski Trail, el.  
 The Meadow Ski Trail, el.  
 Three Acre Wood Ski Trail, el.  
 Upper Landers Trail, el.  
 Upper Wild Acres Ski Trail, el.  
 Upper Zee Ski Trail, el.  
 Vigilante National Recreation Trail, el.  
 Waterfall Ski Trail, el.  
 Weasel Creek Trail, el.  
 West Falls Trail, el.  
 Whitetail Creek Trail, el.  
 Wildside Ski Trail, el.

Further reading

See also
 List of trails of Montana
 Trails of Yellowstone National Park

Notes

Geography of Lewis and Clark County, Montana
 Lewis and Clark County
Transportation in Lewis and Clark County, Montana